Adriana Guzmán (born 30 June 1992) is a Mexican tennis player.

On 18 May 2015, Guzmán reached her best singles ranking of world number 1031. On 27 July 2015, she peaked at world number 1214 in the doubles rankings.

Guzmán made her WTA tour debut at the 2015 Abierto Mexicano Telcel, partnering Carolina Betancourt in doubles.

References 
 
 

1992 births
Living people
Mexican female tennis players
21st-century Mexican women